Bill Cosby is an American comedian, actor, author, producer, and director.

He has received various awards for his work on film and television and for his comedy albums. He received 19 Grammy Award nominations winning 8 awards including six consecutive awards for Best Comedy Album from 1965 to 1970. He received another 2 Grammys for Grammy Award for Best Children's Album for Bill Cosby Talks to Kids About Drugs (1972), and The Electric Company (1973). He also received nine Primetime Emmy Award nominations, receiving three consecutive awards for his leading performance in the drama series  I Spy (1966-1968) becoming the first African American actor to do so. He also won for The Bill Cosby Special (1969), and received the Bob Hope Humanitarian Award in 2003. He also was nominated for five Daytime Emmy Awards winning twice for Fat Albert and the Cosby Kids (1981), and 'Little Bill (2004). He received five Golden Globe Award nominations winning twice for Best Actor in a Comedy Series for The Cosby Show (1984, 1985).

Cosby also received numerous awards and special honors including the Presidential Medal of Freedom in 2002. However due to the widespread allegations of sexual assault Cosby has been stripped of various honorary degrees and awards including the Kennedy Center Honors (1998, rescinded in 2018) and the Mark Twain Prize for American Humor (2009, also rescinded in 2018). In 2018, Cosby was also expelled from the Academy of Motion Picture Arts and Sciences along with Harvey Weinstein and Roman Polanski due to their breach of the Academy's standards of conduct.

Major associations

Emmy Awards

Grammy Awards

Golden Globe Awards

Honorary awards 
 2002: Received the Presidential Medal of Freedom from George W. Bush
 2002: The scholar Molefi Kete Asante included Cosby in his book The 100 Greatest African Americans.
 2005: In a British poll broadcast on Channel 4 to find the Comedian's Comedian, he was voted among the top fifty comedy acts ever by fellow comedians and comedy insiders.
 2010: Received the Lone Sailor Award by the United States Navy Memorial.
 2010: Received the National Football Foundation's Gold Medal

Honorary degrees

Cosby was awarded 72 honorary degrees and many other honors since 1985. 62 of these were revoked after he was accused of sexual offenses or after his conviction for sexual assault.

Rescinded awards
Rescinded awards due to convictions and allegations of sexual assault:
 2011: Received Honorary Chief Petty Officer from U.S. Navy. Revoked December 4, 2014.
 2009: Received the Marian Anderson Award. Rescinded May 3, 2018.
 1998: Received the Kennedy Center Honor. Rescinded May 7, 2018.
 2009: Presented with the 12th annual Mark Twain Prize for American Humor. Rescinded May 7, 2018.
 2002: Received the TCA Career Achievement Award. Rescinded September 25, 2018.
 May 3, 2018, Cosby was expelled as a member of the Actors Branch of the Academy of Motion Picture Arts and Sciences.

References 

Awards
Lists of awards received by American actor